Viktor Ivanovich Kosykh (January 27, 1950 – December 22, 2011) was a Soviet and Russian theater and cinema actor.
He is probably best known for the role of Danko Schusya in the famous film The Elusive Avengers and in its sequels, The New Adventures of the Elusive Avengers and The Crown of the Russian Empire, or Once Again the Elusive Avengers.

He is buried at the Khovanskoye Cemetery.

Partial filmography

 Welcome, or No Trespassing (1964) as Kostya Inochkin
 Father of a Soldier (Отец солдата, 1964) as Vasya
 They're Calling, Open the Door (Звонят, откройте дверь, 1966) as Genka Dresvyannikov
 The Elusive Avengers (Неуловимые мстители, 1967) as Danka Shchus
 The New Adventures of the Elusive Avengers (Новые приключения Неуловимых, 1968) as Danka Shchus
 The Crown of the Russian Empire, or Once Again the Elusive Avengers (Корона Российской Империи, или Снова Неуловимые, 1971) as Danka Shchus
 With You and Without You (С тобой  и без тебя, 1974) as Militiaman
 The Tavern on Pyatnitskaya (Трактир на Пятницкой, 1978) as Lyonka, bandit
 Front Beyond the Front Line (Фронт за линией фронта, 1978) as The soldier
 Od içinda (1978) as Andrey
 Border dog Alyi (Пограничный пёс Алый, 1980) as Captain Eliseev
 Anxious Sunday (Тревожное воскресенье, 1983) as Kolya
 The Cold Summer of 1953 (Холодное лето пятьдесят третьего, 1988) as Baklan, criminal
 Anarchy (Анархия, 1989) as Prisoner

References

External links 
 

1950 births
2011 deaths
Soviet male film actors
Russian male film actors
Gerasimov Institute of Cinematography alumni
Soviet male child actors
Yabloko politicians
Deaths from cerebrovascular disease